Jabal Umm al Ru'us is a town in Saudi Arabia.

Notable people include mechanical engineer Abdul Rahman Al-Athel.

Populated places in Eastern Province, Saudi Arabia